The Yorkshire Evening News Tournament was an international golf tournament in the English Yorkshire area before the European Tour was founded.  It was a match play tournament for most of its existence, but switched to stroke play in the 1940s. The tournament was played annually from 1923 to 1963, with no tournaments held during World War II.

In the early years, this tournament was considered a British major golf tournament. "The first tournament, in 1923, was billed as the  unofficial ‘Championship of the World’ between American superstars Walter Hagen and Gene Sarazen.  Hagen triumphed, but lost in the final by a two-hole margin to Ryder Cup star Herbert Jolly."

Winners

References 

Golf tournaments in England